Good Luck is a manhwa by E-Jin Kang published by Daewon C.I. and was licensed in the United States by Tokyopop.

Characters
 Shi-Hyun
 Shi-Woo
 Ma-Hyun

Volumes

Reception
"Good Luck is a very grounded, authentic feeling book that takes what seems like standard shoujo story clichés and makes them fresh and new simply by injecting realism into them." — Billy Aguiar, Newtype USA.
"Most teenagers can identify with betrayal, love, and the need to put up a false front inside school walls.  If it could pick one plot point and work with it, Good Luck would be a much stronger manhwa." — Nadia Oxford, Mania.
"It's a refreshing change of pace from what we're used to seeing in the shojo titles we've been offered lately." — A. E. Sparrow, IGN.
"Good Luck by E-Jin Kang is a romance and drama manhwa (Korean comics), or better yet, a romantic, teen melodrama." — Leroy Douresseaux, Comic Book Bin.

References

External links
 

Manhwa titles
Tokyopop titles
Romance comics
Daewon C.I. titles